The Municipal Government of Kansas City, Missouri is the largest municipal government in the state of Missouri and one of the largest in the United States. It employs over 2,000 people at all levels and consists of the Mayor of Kansas City and the city manager, the Kansas City City Council, and the Kansas City municipal court. It is headquartered in City Hall, but has offices in various places throughout the city. The municipal government of Kansas City has a budget exceeding $1 billion, due to the citywide 1% tax on income earned in city limits, making it have one of the largest municipal budgets in the nation.

The government of Kansas City is officially non-partisan; however, Democrats have long held a significant dominance of politics throughout the city.  In the last 100 years, only four Republicans have served as mayor. Kansas City is heavily Democratic in the south and east, but tends to be more Republican-leaning in the north.

External links
https://web.archive.org/web/19970413060400/http://www.kcmo.org/

Government of Kansas City, Missouri